Megha Chowdhury is an Indian actress who has worked in Bengali, Telugu, and Tamil-language films.

Career 
Chowdhury began her career as an assistant director for Haseena Parkar (2017) when she was sixteen years old and went on to work as a casting assistant for M.S. Dhoni: The Untold Story (2016). She made her film debut with the Bengali film Amar Prem in 2016. In 2018, she was cast in Bala's Varmaa, the Tamil-language remake of Arjun Reddy (2017). However, the film faced issues and was reshot with a new cast without Chowdhury's involvement.

She made her Telugu debut with the thriller Marshal in which she portrayed a journalist. Regarding her performance, a critic noted that "Debut actress Megha Chowdary doesn't get scope to perform and she seems to be there just for the glamour quotient". That same year, she starred in the Telugu film Oorantha Anukuntunnaru and played a girl next door. Two years after completion, Varmaa was released on 6 October 2020 on over-the-top (OTT) platforms to negative reviews from critics. Regarding her role in the film, M. Suganth of The Times of India stated, "Megha Chowdhury is entirely miscast and there is zero chemistry between her and Dhruv".

Filmography

References

External links 

Actresses in Bengali cinema
Actresses in Tamil cinema
Actresses in Telugu cinema
Living people
People from West Bengal
Year of birth missing (living people)